The Tobacco River is a  river in Keweenaw County on the Upper Peninsula of Michigan in the United States. It rises at the outlet of Thayer Lake and flows east, then south, to Lake Superior, which it joins near the village of Gay.

See also
List of rivers of Michigan

References

Michigan  Streamflow Data from the USGS

Rivers of Michigan
Rivers of Keweenaw County, Michigan
Tributaries of Lake Superior